William Allen Thompson (born October 10, 1946) is a former American football cornerback and safety in the National Football League (NFL). He was drafted by the Denver Broncos in the third round of the 1969 NFL Draft. He played college football at Maryland State College and was inducted into
the Hawk Hall of Fame in 1984.

Thompson was a three-time Pro Bowl selection and was inducted into the Broncos Ring of Fame in 1987.

Professional career
Thompson played his entire 13-year career for the Denver Broncos from 1969-1981. During his career he was selected to the three Pro Bowls in 1977, 1978, and 1981 and was an All-Pro selection in 1977. He is currently third on the Broncos all-time list for games started with 179, tenth in games played with 179, and holds the club record for interception return yards at 784.

See also
 Most consecutive starts by a strong safety

References 

Sportspeople from Greenville, South Carolina
American football safeties
American football cornerbacks
American football return specialists
Maryland Eastern Shore Hawks football players
Denver Broncos players
American Conference Pro Bowl players
1946 births
Living people
African-American players of American football
Players of American football from South Carolina
21st-century African-American people
20th-century African-American sportspeople